The 2023 Central American Men's Handball Championship took place in Managua, Nicaragua from 21 to 25 February. It acted as a qualifying tournament for the 2023 Central American and Caribbean Games and the 2024 South and Central American Men's Handball Championship. The tournament was broadcast by Fanatiz.

Results

Round robin
All times are local (UTC−06:00).

References

External links
COSCABAL Official Website

Central American Handball Championship
Central American Men's Handball Championship
International sports competitions hosted by Nicaragua
Central American Men's Handball Championship
Central American Men's Handball Championship